The 1987 Livingston Open was a men's tennis tournament played on outdoor hard courts that was part of the 1987 Nabisco Grand Prix. It was played at Newark Academy in Livingston, New Jersey in the United States from July 13 through July 20, 1987. First-seeded Johan Kriek won the singles title.

Finals

Singles

 Johan Kriek defeated  Christian Saceanu 7–6, 3–6, 6–2
 It was Kriek's only singles title of the year and the 14th of his career.

Doubles

 Gary Donnelly /  Greg Holmes defeated  Ken Flach /  Robert Seguso 7–6, 6–3
 It was Donnelly's 2nd title of the year and the 7th of his career. It was Holmes' only title of the year and the 1st of his career.

References

External links
 ITF tournament edition details

 
Livingston Open
1987 in sports in New Jersey
1987 in American tennis